The National Order of Merit is an order which is part of the National System of Decorations of Romania. A medal of merit also exists, but does not confer membership in the order.

History
The current order continues a tradition going back well over a century.

Composition of the order
The National Order of Merit is awarded in five grades in civil and military divisions, as well as a wartime division.  It may be awarded to Romanians, foreign citizens, and military units.  Its number is limited to 7,500 members.  Members of the order are referred to as Knights of the Order for Merit, regardless of grade.  Awards to foreigners, awards to military units, and  awards in the wartime division are not figured in the total number under the order's limits.  Awards are limited by grade and division as follows: 
Grand Cross,  150 civilian and  50 military
Grand Officer,  300 civilian and  100 military
Commander,  675 civilian and  225 military
Officer,  1,500 civilian and  500 military
Knight,  3,000 civilian and  1,000 military
Medal:  Civil and  Military Merit Medal

Criteria
The National Order of merit recognizes important civil or military services rendered to Romania.  Qualifying important services may include:
Safeguarding the independence, sovereignty, territorial unity and integrity of the Romanian State
Developing the national economy
Accomplishments in the fields of science, art, or culture
Contribution to the development of relationships between Romania and other countries or international organizations
Meritorious military service organizing and managing military operations
Deeds committed on the battlefield or during military conflicts

Notable recipients

Historical form
 Moses Gaster (1856–1939), "For Merit" National Order of the first class (1891)

Current form 
Nineta Barbulescu
Marek Belka
Valentina Butnaru
Ion Caramitru
Franz, Duke of Bavaria
Mircea Hava
Keith Hitchins
Ion Jinga
Mark A. Meyer
Mihnea Motoc
Raymond T. Odierno
Mircea Răceanu
Prince Radu of Romania
Iancu Țucărman

References

External links 
 
 
 

Orders, decorations, and medals of Romania
Orders of merit
National Order of Merit (Romania)